Carrollton, Georgia is a city in the northwest region of Georgia, about 45 miles (72 km) west of Atlanta near the Alabama state line. It is the county seat of Carroll County, which is included in the Atlanta Metropolitan Area. Historically, Carrollton has been a commercial center for several mostly rural counties in both Georgia and Alabama. It is the home of the University of West Georgia and West Georgia Technical College. It is a rural area with a large farming community. The 2019 United States Census estimates placed the city's population at 27,259.

History
Carroll County, of which Carrollton is the county seat, was chartered in 1826, and was governed at the time by the Carroll Inferior Court, which consisted of five elected justices.

The original intention was to call the new county seat "Troupville", in honor of former governor George Troup, but Troup was not popular with the state government of the time, so the Georgia General Assembly incorporated the town as Carrollton, in December 1829. The name was in honor of Charles Carroll of Carrollton, the last living signer of the Declaration of Independence.

In 1830, the town was surveyed and lots were laid out, with the central feature being the town square, which was later named Adamson Square, for local judge and congressman William C. Adamson.

Although it was the county seat and the main market town for most of Carroll County, transportation of both goods and passengers was difficult until the coming of the railroad in 1874, so Carrollton remained largely a frontier town until well after the Civil War.

The coming of the railroad brought new prosperity to Carrollton. Farmers were able to bring their crops, mostly cotton, to town for shipment to distant markets, and obtain the fertilizers and agricultural supplies they needed. At the same time, consumer goods were more readily available than ever before.

The railroad also encouraged the growth of the fledgling industrial ventures, especially in the textile industry, in and around Carrollton. These early textile mills, mostly water powered, served as the basis for a textile industry that helped ensure the town's prosperity well into the 20th century.

At the start of the 20th century, Carrollton boasted running water and had electric lighting and telephone service. The town began paving its streets in 1918.

In 1906, Carrollton was chosen as the site of the Fourth District Agricultural and Mechanical School, which became West Georgia College in 1934, and is now a 12,834-student university, the University of West Georgia. In May 1964 Robert F. Kennedy visited Carrollton for the dedication of Kennedy Chapel on the university campus.

Carrollton remained an agricultural and textile manufacturing center throughout the first half of the 20th century, but as the local production of cotton declined and the population became more urban, other industries began to take on a greater prominence. Most notable is the Southwire Company. Founded in Carrollton in 1950, Southwire is now one of the world's largest manufacturers of wire and cable and is the largest privately owned wire manufacturer, with more than 1,500 local employees and 5,000 employees worldwide.

This diversification of industry has continued into the 21st century, aided in part by Carrollton's ready access to Interstate 20 and the Norfolk Southern Railway. The city's major employers presently include companies in the airline, construction, power distribution, poultry, software, home entertainment, and healthcare industries, among others.

Carrollton also remains an important market town, with a wide variety of national retail chains and restaurants, serving Carroll County and the surrounding region.

Carrollton was mentioned in Margaret Mitchell's 1936 novel Gone with the Wind and in the 1939 movie of the same name. Carrollton featured in the 1983 TV movie Murder in Coweta County, although the Carrollton scenes were not actually filmed there. Other films shot in the Carrollton area include Conjurer with John Schneider, The Way Home with Dean Cain, and Between Love and a Hard Place with Bern Nadette Stanis. Carrollton was the home of actress Susan Hayward.

On August 21, 1995, Atlantic Southeast Airlines Flight 529 crashed near Carrollton. Nine of the 29 passengers and crew on board were killed as a result of the accident.

The city attracted news media attention amidst allegations of censorship in September 2011 when the mayor overruled the board of the city-owned Carrollton Cultural Arts Center in order to ban as "very offensive" the live stage musical The Rocky Horror Show that had been scheduled for a run just before Halloween. The theater board had authorized use of the venue and appropriated $2,500 for the show, which was already in rehearsal. News reports attributed the mayor's decision to his being shown by the city manager a video of the rehearsal posted by a cast member to a personal Facebook page. In February 2012, three months later than originally planned, the show was produced and privately funded without city money at the Townsend Center for the Performing Arts at the University of West Georgia, also in Carrollton. The Virginia-based anti-censorship Thomas Jefferson Center for the Protection of Free Expression gave one of its national 2012 "Muzzle" awards to the mayor "for appointing himself the arbiter of cultural taste for an entire town, and canceling a pre-approved production of The Rocky Horror Show at a city-owned theater."

Geography
Carrollton is located near the center of Carroll County at  (33.580912, -85.076704). The Little Tallapoosa River flows through the northwestern part of the city. U.S. Route 27 passes through the city center, leading north  to Interstate 20 in Bremen and south  to LaGrange. U.S. Route 27 Alternate leads southeast from the city 23 mi (37 km) to Newnan. Other more local roads that pass through the city include Georgia State Routes 16, 113, and 166.

Climate
Carrollton has a humid subtropical climate (Köppen climate classification Cfa), with mild winters and hot, humid summers.

Severe winter conditions are infrequent. The record for snowfall is 10-11", which fell on December 8 and 9, 2017. During the storm thundersnow was reported. On Christmas Day 2010 Carrollton had its first white Christmas in 17 years.      
                                                                        
Thunderstorms, a few of them severe, can occur during the spring and summer months. The main risk from these storms comes from lightning strikes. Any tornadoes produced by these storms tend to be small and highly localized. Some of the same areas hit by the February 2008 tornadoes were also hit by the Mother's Day tornadoes on May 11, 2008. The Mother's Day Tornadoes did extensive damage to many homes and businesses. In April 2017, a tornado hit Carrollton, destroying a fire station and damaging numerous homes and vehicles. The tornado also hit on the campus of the University of West Georgia.

Possibly the most significant severe weather risk comes from hurricanes that strike the Florida Panhandle. These storms track northward through Alabama as tropical storms, and some have brought high winds, heavy rainfall, and the occasional tornado to the Carrollton area, resulting in significant property damage. In October 1995 Hurricane Opal slammed the Florida panhandle then moved north into Alabama and then east into Georgia. The Carrollton area was hit with tropical storm force winds killing one person when a tree came down into a mobile home. Some area residents were without electricity for almost two weeks. In 2005 a feeder band from Hurricane Katrina produced a tornado that killed one person just south of Carrollton. Flooding is also a concern for the area. In September 2009, up to a foot of rain fell in some areas, flooding many homes, washing away roads and bridges, and claiming the lives of ten people in Georgia.

Transportation

Major roads

  State Route 1
  State Route 16
  U.S. Route 27
  State Route 113
  State Route 166

Pedestrians and cycling

 Carrollton Greenbelt
 UWG Nature Trails

Demographics

2020 census

As of the 2020 United States Census, there were 26,738 people, 9,024 households, and 5,206 families residing in the city.

2000 census
As of the 2000 census, there were 19,843 people, 7,121 households, and 3,966 families residing in the city.  The population density was 379.8/km2 (983.7/mi2).  There were 7,577 housing units at an average density of 145.0/km2 (375.6/mi2).  The racial makeup of the city was 62.49% White, 31.16% Black, 0.22% Native American, 1.26% Asian, 0.01% Pacific Islander, 2.88% from other races, and 1.98% from two or more races. Hispanic or Latino of any race were 5.64% of the population.

There were 7,121 households, out of which 27.2% had children under the age of 18 living with them, 35.0% were married couples living together, 16.5% had a female householder with no husband present, and 44.3% were non-families. 32.1% of all households were made up of individuals, and 10.8% had someone living alone who was 65 years of age or older.  The average household size was 2.37 and the average family size was 3.01.

In the city the population was spread out, with 20.6% under the age of 18, 27.0% from 18 to 24, 26.0% from 25 to 44, 15.1% from 45 to 64, and 11.3% who were 65 years of age or older.  The median age was 26 years. For every 100 females, there were 87.2 males.  For every 100 females age 18 and over, there were 83.7 males.

The median income for a household in the city was $27,559, and the median income for a family was $39,143. Males had a median income of $30,600 versus $23,224 for females. The per capita income for the city was $16,803.  About 15.5% of families and 23.4% of the population were below the poverty line, including 26.7% of those under age 18 and 17.0% of those age 65 or over.

Parks and recreation
Several parks are located in Carrollton such as Longview Park, Knox Park and Castle Playground.

The Carrollton Greenbelt is the largest paved loop in the state of Georgia. It is 18 miles long and is used for walking and bicycling. The trail goes all around Carrollton and has "trailheads" at Laura's Park at Hays Mill, Old-Newnan Road, Lakeshore Park, and more.

East Carrollton Park is located near Lake Carroll.

Culture
Carrollton's downtown area is named Adamson Square after Congressman William C. Adamson. Local restaurants include the Corner Cafe, The Alley Cat, Plates on the Square (the upstairs bar is known as Uncorked at Plates), and Gallery Row Coffee Shop; all are within walking distance of one another. The Alley Cat and Uncorked at Plates frequently schedule bands and other events. Adamson Square is the host to many of Carrollton's events, such as the annual Mayfest which takes place in the first week of May. Another shop located on Adamson Square is Horton's Books & Gifts, certified as the oldest bookstore in Georgia by the American Booksellers Association. Founded in 1892, it is Carrollton and Carroll County's oldest business and is still in its original location. Right off the Square is the Carrollton Center for the Arts, the site of Carrollton Festival of the Arts, an arts and crafts festival held in October. Downtown on Adamson Square is the Irish Bred Pub, which first opened its doors in May 2006.

In 2012 The AMP at Adamson Square debuted; this outdoor covered amphitheater can seat 800–1,000 people and shows a variety of free music and movie performances.

Carrollton is well known for its diverse live music tradition.  Many restaurants offer live music performances as well as Sutton's Back Room and the Lowell Opry House where staged concerts are held.

One block south of the Square is the Southeastern Quilt & Textile Museum, which opened in September 2012. Exhibits have featured traditional and contemporary quilts by both solo artists and various regional guilds, and a partnership with the Center for Public History at the University of West Georgia has enabled the museum to exhibit highlights of the history of the local textile industry.

In the Industrial part of town off of Columbia drive near Southwire is Printer's Ale Manufacturing Company. Established in 2017 this is Carrollton's only Brewery and Taproom. Many, if not all of downtown Carrollton carries the local craft beer.

Carrollton has about 100 places of worship. The Sacred Harp Publishing Company, a non-profit organization supporting Sacred Harp singing, publishes the most widely used edition of the Sacred Harp songbook. Carrollton is the birthplace of Baptist pastor Jerry Vines. It is also the home of a small denomination: the National Association of Wesleyan Evangelicals.

Sports

Current sports franchises
 Georgia Storm FC - National Premier Soccer League - Formed in 2020 and competes in the Southeast Region of the NPSL. Home games are played at the University of West Georgia soccer field.

Defunct sports franchises
 Carrollton Hornets - Georgia–Alabama League - Minor league baseball team that competed from 1946 to 1950.

Stadiums
 Grisham Stadium - Multi-purpose home stadium for Carrollton High School.

 University Stadium - Home football stadium for the West Georgia Wolves.

Education

Carroll County School District 
The Carroll County School District provides education from pre-school through grade twelve and consists of twelve elementary schools, six middle schools, and five high schools.
Schools located in Carrollton include:
 Central High School
 Central Middle School
 Central Elementary School
 Mount Zion High School
 Mount Zion Elementary School
 Sand Hill Elementary School
 Sharp Creek Elementary School

Carrollton City School District 
The Carrollton City School District serves grades pre-school through twelve and consists of one lower elementary school, an upper elementary school, a junior high school, and a high school.
 Carrollton High School 
 Carrollton Junior High School
 Carrollton Upper Elementary School 
 Carrollton Elementary School

Carver High School 

George Washington Carver High School served as the only black high school in Carrollton during racial segregation in the South. The school was closed in 1969.

Higher education 
West Georgia Technical College - Carroll Campus
University of West Georgia - Main Campus

Private schools 
The Bridge Learning Center
 Oak Mountain Academy
 Oak Grove Montessori School
 Liberty Eagle Academy

Notable people

 William C. Adamson - politician, Associate Justice of the United States Customs Court and member of the Board of General Appraisers
 Margie Alexander - American gospel and soul singer
 Terry Boyd - former CBA player
 Reggie Brown - former Philadelphia Eagles and University of Georgia wide receiver
 Bull Buchanan - current Rampage Pro Wrestling World Heavyweight Champion
 Mark Butler - politician
 Betty Reynolds Cobb - attorney, author, and activist
 Cooper Criswell - pitcher for the Tampa Bay Rays
 Corey Crowder - former NBA player
 Richard DeLong - Sacred Harp singer
 Patrick Gamble - former NFL and Georgia Tech defensive end
 Bill Hamrick - lawyer, politician, and judge
 Hollis L. Harris - former president and COO of Delta Air Lines and chairman, president, and CEO of Continental Airlines, Air Canada, and World Airways
 Josh Harris, NFL long snapper and Auburn University graduate
 Julian Hoke Harris - famous sculptor
 Susan Hayward - Academy Award-winning actress
 Jamie Henderson - former New York Jets and University of Georgia cornerback
 Michael 'Mike' Huey - professional drummer and record producer
 John Willis Hurst - personal cardiologist for Lyndon B. Johnson
 Jonathan Jones - football cornerback for the New England Patriots
 Nick Jones - former Seattle Seahawks center and current Los Angeles Rams coaching assistant
 Catherine Hardy Lavender - Olympic athlete and gold medalist
 Terry Lowry - American composer, pianist and conductor
 MJ Morris - quarterback at North Carolina State University
 Dylan Parham - offensive guard for the Las Vegas Raiders
 Darnell Powell - former Buffalo Bills and New York Jets running back and UTC graduate
 Dontavius Russell - NFL defensive tackle and free agent
 Steve Thomas - NBA and former CBA player
 Kin Vassy - country singer and songwriter
 Don Wix - politician
 Amy Yates - murder victim for whom Amy's Law is named

See also

1987 Carroll County Cryptosporidiosis outbreak

References

External links

 City of Carrollton official website 
 Six Industrial Giants historical marker

Cities in Georgia (U.S. state)
Cities in Carroll County, Georgia
County seats in Georgia (U.S. state)